Reay Parish Church is a Church of Scotland parish church serving Reay, Caithness. It is one of the most northerly communities on the Scottish mainland, located several miles to west of Thurso. The largest local employer is the Dounreay nuclear facility.

History
Built in 1739, the church is a T-shaped church, and is protected as a category A listed building. Externally it is painted white. The wooden pulpit is probably original to the church, complete with an old sounding board as a canopy. The pulpit is on the long wall of the church with the people seated facing each other on dark varnished wooden pews along two arms of the 'T' shape; the third part was partitioned off in the 1950s to form a vestry. Sunday services prior to 2006 Union with Strathy and Halladale were held at 10.45am each Sunday, with communion twice yearly (on the last Sunday of April and September), following which they now take place at 11.00 ön The 1st and 3rd Sundays in The Month.

In 1989 the church building celebrated its 250th anniversary. The celebrations included a major restoration programme, a visit by Her Majesty Queen Elizabeth the Queen Mother and a visit by the Moderator of the General Assembly of the Church of Scotland, the Very Reverend Dr William McDonald. The minister, the Reverend James Dewar, wrote a history of the church, "The Old White House of God". (now out of print, but available in Thurso library).

In 1994 Reay Parish Church was linked with neighbouring Strathy & Halladale Parish Church in Sutherland, being henceforth served by the same minister. The linked parishes are, however, within the Church of Scotland’s Presbytery of Caithness. Since the Reverend James Dewar moved to Edinburgh in 2000 to become minister at Juniper Green Parish Church the linked parishes have been without a permanent minister.

In 2006 Reay, Strathy and Halladale parishes were united into one "North Coast Parish Church" (NCPC), but retaining separate places of worship. The first Minister of NCPC was Rev. Paul R Read BSc MA, who was inducted to the parish on 18 August 2006.

Rev. David Macartney BA Hons was inducted as minister of the North Coast Parish on 22 September 2017.

References

External links

North Coast Parish Church
Church of Scotland

Church of Scotland churches in Scotland
Churches in Highland (council area)
Category A listed buildings in Highland (council area)
Listed churches in Scotland
Buildings and structures in Caithness